From the 1340s to the 19th century, excluding two brief intervals in the 1360s and the 1420s, the kings and queens of England and Ireland (and, later, of Great Britain) also claimed the throne of France.  The claim dates from Edward III, who claimed the French throne in 1340 as the sororal nephew of the last direct Capetian, Charles IV.  Edward and his heirs fought the Hundred Years' War to enforce this claim, and were briefly successful in the 1420s under Henry V and Henry VI, but the House of Valois, a cadet branch of the Capetian dynasty, was ultimately victorious and retained control of France, except for Calais (later lost in 1558) and the Channel Islands (which had historically formed part also of the Duchy of Normandy).  English and British monarchs continued to prominently call themselves kings of France, and the French fleur-de-lis was included in the royal arms. This continued until 1801, by which time France no longer had any monarch, having become a republic. The Jacobite claimants, however, did not explicitly relinquish the claim.

Overview

The title was first assumed in 1340 by Edward III of England, the Kingdom of England being ruled by the Plantagenet dynasty at the time. Edward III claimed the throne of France after the death of his uncle Charles IV of France. At the time of Charles IV's death in 1328, Edward was his nearest male relative through Edward's mother Isabella of France.  Since the election of Hugh Capet in 987, the French crown had always passed based on male-line relations (father to son until 1316). There was no precedent for someone succeeding to the French throne based on his maternal ancestry, nor had there been a need to.  There had been no shortage of sons for more than three centuries from the inception of the House of Capet until the early 14th century, when new precedents concerning female inheritance finally had to be introduced.  On the death of Philip IV the Fair's son Louis X in 1316, immediately followed by that of his son John I the Posthumous, it had to be decided whether his young daughter Joan or his brother Philip would succeed to the throne. Philip arranged for his coronation, and became Philip V of France. He was challenged by the supporters of the Princess Joan, daughter of Louis X, on the basis of his right to the throne. In response, he convened an assembly of prelates, barons, and burgesses at Paris, who acknowledged him as their lawful king, and declared that "Women do not succeed to the throne of France." This was later said to have been based on the 5th century Salic law, but it is now known that the Salic Law was only rediscovered later and used by the lawyers of the Valois kings to fortify their masters' title with an additional aura of authenticity.

Claimants to the French throne in 1328:

At the time of Charles's death in 1328, there was once again a dispute over the succession.  Although it had come to be accepted that a woman could not possess the French throne in her own right, Edward III, the nephew of the deceased king and thus the nearest adult male relative, based his claim on the theory that a woman could transmit a right of inheritance to her son.  This claim was rejected by French jurists under the principle Nemo plus juris ad alium transfere potest quam ipse habet (no one can transfer a greater right to another than he himself has), and the throne was given to the male line heir, Philip, Count of Valois, a first cousin of the deceased king. At the time, Edward paid homage to Philip VI for his Duchy of Aquitaine. In 1337, however, Edward, in his capacity as Duke of Aquitaine, refused to pay homage to Philip. The French king's response was to confiscate what was left of lands in English-held Aquitaine, namely Gascony, thus precipitating the Hundred Years' War and Edward's revival of his claim to the throne and title of King of France in 1340.

The decision to assume the title of "King of France" was made at the solicitation of his Flemish allies, who had signed a treaty that they would no longer attack the French king. They said that if Edward took the French royal title, then the Flemish would be able to keep their honour, since they would not be attacking the "true King of France" (Edward III).

Edward continued to use this title until the Treaty of Brétigny on 8 May 1360, when he abandoned his claims in return for substantial lands in France.  After the resumption of hostilities between the English and the French in 1369, Edward resumed his claim and the title of King of France. His successors also used the title until the Treaty of Troyes on 21 May 1420, in which the English recognised Charles VI as King of France, but with his new son-in-law King Henry V of England as his heir (disinheriting Charles VI's son, the Dauphin Charles). Henry V then adopted the title Heir of France instead.

Henry V and Charles VI died within two months of each other in 1422, and Henry V's infant son (Charles VI's grandson) Henry VI became King of France. He was the only English king who was de facto King of France, rather than using the style as a mere title of pretense. By 1429 Charles VII, with the support of Joan of Arc, had been crowned at Reims and begun to push the English out of northern France.  In 1435, an end to the French civil war between Burgundians and Armagnacs allowed Charles to return to Paris the following year, and by 1453 the English had been driven out of their last strongholds in Normandy and Guyenne.  The only French territory left to the English was Calais which they held until 1558 and the Channel Islands.

Original claimants

"Kings of France" (1340)

Edward III, King of England (reigned, first term 24 January 1340 – 8 May 1360).

"Kings of France" (title resumed 1369)

Edward III, King of England (reigned, second term 1369 – 21 June 1377).
Richard II, King of England (reigned 21 June 1377 – 29 September 1399).
Henry IV, King of England (reigned 30 September 1399 – 20 March 1413).
Henry V, King of England (reigned 20 March 1413 – 21 May 1420).

Heir of France de jure (1420)
Henry V, King of England (term 21 May 1420 – 31 August 1422)
Henry VI, King of England (term 31 August – 21 October 1422). Succeeded as King of France upon the death of Charles VI, according to the Treaty of Troyes.

Kings of France (1422)
Henry VI, King of England (reigned, from England, 21 October 1422 – 4 March 1461; 31 October 1470 – 11 April 1471) was de jure king of France (although in reality only king of northern France) according to the Treaty of Troyes, ruling formally as Henry II of France (crowned at Paris, 16 December 1431). The English continued to hold significant portions of France until 1449, after which nearly all English-held territory was seized by his Capetian rival. That rival was the de facto king of southern France, Charles VII, who claimed the succession of his father in 1422, although he was not crowned until the recapture of Reims in 1429. After 1453, the only remaining English holding in France was Calais. Henry, though deposed in England by Edward IV on 4 March 1461, continued to be recognised as king by supporters of the House of Lancaster, and was briefly restored to the English throne in 1470.

Rulers of Calais and the Channel Islands
Following a year-long episode of catatonia on the part of Henry VI of England in 1453 and the subsequent outbreak of the Wars of the Roses (1455–87), the English were no longer in any position to pursue their claim to the French throne and lost all their land on the continent, except for Calais (and, off the mainland but within ancient France, the Channel Islands).

Calais was ruled by eight more English monarchs, who claimed to also rule France, until 1558:

Edward IV (4 March 1461 – 30 October 1470; 11 April 1471 – 9 April 1483).
Edward V (9 April – 25 June 1483).
Richard III (26 June 1483 – 22 August 1485).
Henry VII (22 August 1485 – 21 April 1509).
Henry VIII (21 April 1509 – 28 January 1547).
Edward VI (28 January 1547 – 6 July 1553).
Jane (6/10 – 19 July 1553), de facto monarch.
Mary I (19 July 1553 – 7 January 1558).
Philip (jure uxoris; 25 July 1554 – 7 January 1558).

No treaty has ever explicitly taken the Channel Islands out of the Kingdom of France. The Treaty of Paris of 1259 separated the islands from the Duchy of Normandy but reaffirmed the fact that the king of England was holding them "as peer of France".

The kings of France maintained a claim over the islands. But they remained under the control of the English kings who ruled them in their quality of "kings of France" until the 1802 Treaty of Amiens. 

There were a few unsuccessful attempts by the French to take the islands, culminating with the Battle of Jersey in 1781.

Tudor claimants
Ill feeling between the two nations continued well into the 16th century. Calais was captured by French troops under Francis, Duke of Guise on 7 January 1558.  Mary and Philip continued, however, to be styled Queen and King of France for the rest of her reign, as did Mary I's half-sister and successor Elizabeth I, despite her abandonment of her claims to Calais in the Treaty of Cateau-Cambrésis of 1559. Elizabeth I revived England's claims to Calais and took the French port of Le Havre in 1561.  French forces ejected the English in 1563, and the Treaty of Troyes (1564), recognised French ownership of Calais, in return for payment to England of 120,000 crowns.

Mary I and Philip of England (7 January – 17 November 1558)
Elizabeth I of England (17 November 1558 – 24 March 1603)

Stuart dynasty claimants

Elizabeth died childless. Her successor was her cousin Mary, Queen of Scots’ son James VI of Scotland. The thrones of England and Scotland were joined in a dynastic union until 1707. The seven monarchs of this period continued to use the style King/Queen of France, though their claim was merely nominal. None of them was willing to engage in military campaigns for France against the actual Kings of France Henry IV, Louis XIII and Louis XIV of France. Indeed, Charles I married a sister of Louis XIII, and his son Charles II spent much of his exile during the Interregnum in France (at which time, even if not formally abandoning his claim for its throne, he certainly did not emphasise it).

James I of England and VI of Scotland (24 March 1603 – 27 March 1625).
Charles I of England and Scotland (27 March 1625 – 30 January 1649).
Charles II of England and Scotland (30 January 1649 – 6 February 1685).
James II of England and VII of Scotland (6 February 1685 – 12 February 1689).
Mary II of England and Scotland (13 February 1689 – 28 December 1694).
William III of England and II of Scotland (13 February 1689 – 8 March 1702).
Anne of England and Scotland (8 March 1702 – 1 May 1707).

Claimants of Great Britain

The Act of Union 1707 declared the joining of the Kingdom of England with the Kingdom of Scotland to a new Kingdom of Great Britain. The Kingdom had four Monarchs until 1801. They also styled themselves Queen/King of France; however, none of them made any official move to depose Louis XIV and his successors, Louis XV and Louis XVI, or the First French Republic that followed them:
Anne, Queen of Great Britain (1 May 1707 – 1 August 1714).
George I of Great Britain (1 August 1714 – 11 June 1727).
George II of Great Britain (11 June 1727 – 25 October 1760).
George III of Great Britain (25 October 1760 – 31 December 1800).

Ending the claim

During the French Revolution, the monarchy was abolished on 21 September 1792, replaced with the French Republic. In the War of the First Coalition British–French negotiations were held in Lille from July to November 1797. The French demanded that the English monarch drop the title; James Harris, 1st Earl of Malmesbury was prepared to omit it from the king's signature to the envisaged peace treaty but had not conceded further by the time the talks collapsed. In the Commons' discussion of the negotiations, Sir John Sinclair called the demand "frivolous" and "hardly worth contending for"; William Pitt the Younger called the title "a harmless feather, at most, in the crown of England"; French Laurence called it an "ancient dignity" the ceding of which would lose honour and bring disgrace. In 1800, the Act of Union joined the Kingdom of Great Britain with the Kingdom of Ireland to a new United Kingdom of Great Britain and Ireland. George III chose this opportunity to drop his claim to the now defunct French throne, whereupon the fleurs-de-lis, part of the coat of arms of all claimant Kings of France since the time of Edward III, was also removed from the British royal arms. Britain recognised the French Republic by the Treaty of Amiens of 1802. Dropping the French claim resulted in a change of status for the Channel Islands. The constitutional relationship of the Islands with Great Britain has never been enshrined in a formal constitutional document. Until 1802 this link existed through the Crown's French claim. Starting in 1802 the islands became British Crown dependencies.

Although the fleurs-de-lys were completely removed from the Royal coat of arms of the United Kingdom, they were later included in the arms of Canada, a British dominion, where they symbolise the heritage of the French Canadians, rather than the former British claim to the French throne.

While the position of King of France was restored between 1814 and 1848, subsequent British monarchs did not pursue the claim to the French throne, whether of the Kingdom of France or of the French Empire.

Jacobite pretenders 

The change was not acknowledged by Jacobite claimants.

The Jacobite pretenders were the deposed James II of England and his successors, continuing to style themselves "Kings of England, Scotland, France and Ireland" past their deposition in 1689. All four pretenders continued to actively claim the title King of France as well as that of King of England, Scotland and Ireland from 1689 until 1807:

 James II and VII (12 February 1689 – 16 September 1701).
 James Francis Edward Stuart (16 September 1701 – 1 January 1766), styled James III and VIII, also known as the Chevalier de St. George or as the Old Pretender.
 Charles Edward Stuart (1 January 1766 – 31 January 1788), styled Charles III, also known as Bonnie Prince Charlie, the Young Chevalier, or as the Young Pretender.
 Cardinal Henry Benedict Stuart (31 January 1788 – 13 July 1807), self-styled Henry IX and I, King of England, Scotland, France and Ireland.

James II for the last twelve years of his life and his son, the Old Pretender, until the Treaty of Utrecht in 1713, were actually pensioners of Louis XIV at the very time they were claiming his title.

Jacobite successors

The Jacobite succession has continued since 1807 but none of the eight subsequent holders of the claims has actively pursued it. They continue to be customarily known as "King (or Queen) of France" by the Jacobites.

Charles Emmanuel IV of Sardinia (13 July 1807 – 6 October 1819), descended from the youngest daughter of Charles I.
Victor Emmanuel I of Sardinia (6 October 1819 – 10 January 1824), his brother.
Maria Beatrice, Princess of Sardinia and later by marriage Duchess of Modena (10 January 1824 – 15 September 1840), his daughter.
Francis V, Duke of Modena (15 September 1840 – 20 November 1875), her son.
Maria Theresia, Princess of Modena and later Queen consort of Bavaria (20 November 1875 – 3 February 1919), his niece.
Rupprecht, Crown Prince of Bavaria (3 February 1919 – 2 August 1955), her son.
Albrecht, Duke of Bavaria (2 August 1955 – 8 July 1996), his son.
Franz, Duke of Bavaria (since 8 July 1996), his son.
The heir presumptive of the Jacobite claim is Franz's younger brother
 Prince Max, Duke in Bavaria; then his daughter
 Sophie, Hereditary Princess of Liechtenstein; and then her eldest son
 Prince Joseph Wenzel of Liechtenstein, born 24 May 1995 in London – the first heir in the Jacobite line born in the British Isles since James III and VIII, The Old Pretender, in 1688.

Failed claimants
In addition two failed claimants to the throne of England were also styled King of France. They are usually omitted from regnal lists.

Lambert Simnel, impersonating Edward Plantagenet, 17th Earl of Warwick. Styled "Edward VI, King of England and France" (24 May – 16 June 1487). Captured in the Battle of Stoke Field by Henry VII.
James Scott, 1st Duke of Monmouth. Styled "King of England, Scotland, France and Ireland" (20 June – 6 July 1685). Captured after the Battle of Sedgemoor by James II/VII, and was subsequently beheaded for high treason.

See also
Mary, Queen of Scots & Francis II of France (Auld Alliance claim compounding the English claim)
Style of the British sovereign
Salic law
France – United Kingdom relations
Franco-British union

References

Sources

Citations

External links
 .

Lists of office-holders
 
English monarchs
British monarchs
French
Jacobitism
French
 
Rival successions
Style of the British sovereign